In England, learning and skills refers typically to post-compulsory education and training, provided by further education and sixth form colleges, schools with sixth forms, local authority and adult education institutions, private and voluntary sector providers, offender learning, and workplace learning including Apprenticeships and other employer-facing initiatives. 
The learning and skills sector is vital to increasing productivity, economic competitiveness and sustainable employment in the UK

Learning and skills also refers to the actual learning which learners undertake and the skills they acquire.

Responsibility for learning and skills 
Funding of provision is subject to frequent change.  The former Learning and Skills Council (2001-2010) was replaced by the Skills Funding Agency (still operating April 2012) and the Young People's Learning Agency (now closed and incorporated into the Education Funding Agency from April 2012). It is wise to consult government department websites - Department for Education, and DBIS, for updated information.

Providers of learning and skills 

The learning and skills sector is made up of a number of different training providers, such as colleges and private organisations, and also includes workplace learning and offender learning.

Further education colleges and adult education institutes 

Further education colleges can vary considerably in size, and in the subjects and facilities they offer. Many are ‘general’ FE colleges and offer courses in a wide range of subject areas.

Some further education colleges are specialist colleges, and offer subjects such as agriculture and horticulture, drama and dance. Other specialist colleges cater for students with a particular disability or learning difficulty.

Private training providers 

Private training providers can include profit-making or voluntary organisations.

Schools with sixth forms and sixth form colleges 

Sixth forms also vary a lot in size, and in the courses and facilities they offer. Sixth form colleges tend to be larger and more informal than school sixth forms and offer both academic style courses (such as A levels) and vocational programmes.

Workplace learning 

Workplace learning falls into a number of categories. It can include training for people looking for work, for people learning how to do a job (for example through Apprenticeships or for people learning new skills in their current job (through continuing professional development or employer-facing work initiatives such as Train to Gain). Workplace learning can be offered through different mediums - classroom training, e-learning, or blended learning, a mix of the two.

Offender learning 

Offender learning is provides learning activities for offenders in prison or those in the community under the supervision of the Probation Service.

Programmes offered by learning and skills providers 

Programmes offered by learning and skills providers are very diverse and range from basic skills basic skills courses to Foundation Degrees, including both academic and vocational qualifications.
 
These programmes are accredited by various awarding bodies, under the supervision of the Qualifications and Curriculum Authority which regulates the qualifications system in England.

See also 
 Further education
 Lifelong learning 
 Vocational education

References

External links 
  Department for Business Innovation and Skills
 Skills Funding Agency

Education in England
Educational stages
Vocational education in the United Kingdom